The Sunnyside Mall is a  Canadian shopping mall in Bedford, Nova Scotia.

See also
 List of Canada's largest shopping malls
 List of shopping malls in Canada
 Bedford, Nova Scotia

References

External links
Nova Scotia - Maritime Memories VHS 1980's
Official Website

Shopping malls in Halifax, Nova Scotia
Shopping malls established in 1963
Tourist attractions in Halifax County, Nova Scotia